Raksha  is a 2008 Telugu-language horror thriller film produced by Azam Khan on One More Thought Entertainment & Zed3 Pictures Productions banner, presented by Ram Gopal Varma and directed by Vamsi Krishna Akella. The film stars Jagapati Babu and Kalyani in the lead roles, while the music is composed by Bappi-Tutul. It is a remake of Ram Gopal Varma's Phoonk, whose story was thematically similar to the Telugu thriller novel, Tulasi Dalam, by Yandamuri Veerendranath.

Plot
The film begins with Rajeev owner of Raksha Construction Company leading a delightful life with his wife Arthi, and their children Rahul & Raksha. Moreover, he has immense affection for his daughter Raksha. Venu the bestie of Rajeev works in his company along with his wife Madhu whom he facilitates all comforts. Rajeev is an atheist, but his wife and mother have immense belief in God and black magic (Chethabadalu). On a regular day of his work at the construction site, his manager Shyam finds an ancient Ganesh idol. He also advises Rajeev to construct a temple therein otherwise it would be a bad omen for them. However, Rajeev takes heads deaf to his words. One day Rajeev is aware of Venu and Madhu as swindlers by his friend Vinay. Then he is rude to and expels them from his company.

After that, suddenly on an uneventful day, strange things happen in his house and Raksha starts behaving unusually. His mother and wife plead to him to overlook this unforeseen circumstance but he will not listen to them. But sadly, her health levels start deteriorating. So, he consults a psychiatrist Dr. Rangarajan who is tongue-tied and unable to explain the changes that are happening to Raksha. In that fatal condition, Rajeev starts believing in God and owes to construct the temple on his site. Vinay takes him to a black magician Baba and finds out that it is black magic done by Venu & Madhu and with the support of Rajeev's car driver Mani. Parallelly, a specialist Dr. Seema detects it as an obsession that erupted due to the silliness of Rajeevi's mother. At last, Rajeev finds out the whereabouts of Venu & Madhu and destroys the black magic. Simultaneously, Seema makes Raksha normal with hypnotism. The movie ends with a dichotomy on the existence of God and science.

Cast

 Jagapati Babu as Rajeev 
 Kalyani as Aarthi 
 Baby Neha as Raksha
 Master Athulith as Rahul
 Radha Kumari as Rajeev's mother
 Pradeep Rawat as Baba
 Jayasudha as Dr. Seema
 Subbaraju as Vinay
 Rajiv Kanakala as Venu
 Satya Krishnan as Madhu
 Chatrapathi Sekhar as Mani
 Jeeva as Dr. Rangarajan 
 Narsing Yadav as Shyam
 Shankar Melkote as Dr. Pandey
 Bhargavi as Lakshmi

References

External links

2008 films
2000s Telugu-language films
2008 horror films
Films about exorcism
Films based on Indian novels
Telugu remakes of Hindi films
Indian horror film remakes